Liu Jian may refer to:
 Liu Jian (diplomat) (born 1956), Chinese ambassador to Afghanistan, Malaysia, and Pakistan
 Liu Jian (Volkswagen) (died 2010), head of Shanghai Volkswagen
 Liu Jian (director) (born 1969), Chinese animation filmmaker
 Liu Jian (footballer) (born 1984), Chinese association footballer
 Liu Jian (rower) (born 1974), Chinese Olympic rower
 Jian Liu (academic) (born 1962), American pharmacologist